World records in sport stacking are maintained by the World Sport Stacking Association (WSSA). Sport stacking world records can be set at sanctioned WSSA events. The WSSA reviews video of potential world record attempts before certifying a time as a new world record.

In March 2021, WSSA introduced a new design for timers, and announced that all the previous records will be frozen and kept as "legacy records".

3-3-3 World Record Progression

Female

3-6-3 World Record Progression

Female

Cycle World Record Progression

Female

Doubles World Record Progression

3-6-3 Relay World Record Progression

References

Sport stacking
Sports world records